The 2022–23 Spartan South Midlands Football League season is the 26th in the history of the Spartan South Midlands Football League, a football competition in England. The league operates three divisions, two of which are in covered in this article, the Premier Division, at Step 5 and Division One at Step 6 of the English football league system.

The league constitution for this season was based on allocations for Steps 5 and 6 that were announced by The Football Association on 12 May 2022, and are subject to appeals.

Premier Division

At the end of the previous season, eight teams left the Premier Division:
 Broadfields United, transferred to the Combined Counties League
 Flackwell Heath, transferred to the Combined Counties League
 Hadley, promoted to the Isthmian League
 Harefield United, transferred to the Combined Counties League
 Holmer Green, relegated to Division One
 Milton Keynes Irish, transferred to the United Counties League
 New Salamis, promoted to the Southern League
 Oxhey Jets, transferred to the Combined Counties League

The remaining 12 teams, together with the following, formed the Premier Division for 2022–23:
 Biggleswade United, transferred from the United Counties League
 Cockfosters, transferred from the Essex Senior League
 Colney Heath, relegated to the Southern League
 Hoddesdon Town, transferred from the Essex Senior League
 Potton United, transferred from the United Counties League
 Shefford Town & Campton, promoted from Division One
 Stotfold, promoted from Division One
 St Panteleimon, transferred from the Combined Counties League

Premier Division table
Prior to the first match(es) being played the Pos column shows alphabetic sequence of teams rather than league position.

Division One

At the end of the previous season, six teams left Division One:
 Irchester United, relegated to the Northamptonshire Combination League
 Kidlington Reserves, transferred to the Hellenic League
 Long Crendon, transferred to the Hellenic League
 Penn & Tylers Green, transferred to the Combined Counties League
 Shefford Town & Campton, promoted to the Premier Division
 Stotfold, promoted to the Premier Division

The remaining 14 teams, together with the following, will form Division One for 2022–23:
 Eaton Socon, promoted from the Cambridgshire County League
 Holmer Green, relegated from the Premier Division
 Lutterworth Athletic, transferred from the United Counties League
 Moulton, promoted from the Northamptonshire Combination League
 Northampton ON Chenecks, relegated from the United Counties League
 Rugby Borough, promoted from the Leicestershire Senior League

Bedford changed their name to Real Bedford.

Division One table
Prior to the first match(es) being played the Pos column shows alphabetic sequence of teams rather than league position.

References

2020-21
9